Dendronephthya is a genus of soft corals in the family Nephtheidae. There are over 250 described species in this genus. They are sometimes kept in aquariums, but are notoriously difficult to keep, requiring a near constant supply of small foods such as phytoplankton.

Species

References

External links
 

Nephtheidae
Octocorallia genera